High Ellington is a village in lower Wensleydale in North Yorkshire, England, about  north-west of Masham. High Ellington is in Harrogate district, and is the largest settlement in the civil parish of Ellington High and Low, which also includes Low Ellington and the scattered settlement of Sutton (which includes High Sutton, Low Sutton, Sutton Penn and Sutton Grange). The population of the parish was estimated at 60 in 2013.

High Ellington was historically, with Low Ellington, a township in the ancient parish of Masham in the North Riding of Yorkshire.  At the time of the Domesday Book it was in the possession of Count Alan of Brittany.  It became a civil parish in 1866, then known as Ellingtons.  In 1886 Sutton was transferred to the parish from Healey with Sutton.

The parish now shares a grouped parish council, known as Masham Parish Council, with Masham,  Burton on Yore and Swinton with Warthermarske.

References

External links

Villages in North Yorkshire